Hülya Duyar (born 26 June 1970) is a Turkish actress.

Life 
Duyar immigrated to Germany in 1978, when she was very young. In 1989, she completed her training as a hairdresser and became a make-up artist, initially at theatres. Here, her talent as an actress was discovered, by which she received numerous engagements all over Germany as well as abroad.

In 2000, she began her work on film and television. In addition to filming, she is also active in the fields of masking and casting.

Filmography

As actress

As producer

As writer

References

External links 
 

1970 births
Living people
People from Sivas
German film actresses
Turkish emigrants to Germany
German people of Turkish descent